Events from the year 1587 in Sweden

Incumbents
 Monarch – John III

Events

 - The Vadstena artiklar grants the King the right to appoint bishops and officials in the Duchies of the princes. 
 - A clerical meeting in Strängnäs confirm the Örebro artiklar and protest to the pro-Catholic liturgy of the King.
 - The Swedish-born Crown Prince Sigismund III Vasa is elected King of Poland, 
 - The Royal Council forces the King and Crown Prince to agree to Kalmar stadgar, which protects the independence of Sweden during the potential personal union between Sweden and Poland.

Births

 15 June - Gabriel Gustafsson Oxenstierna, Lord High Steward of Sweden  (died 1640)
 - Louis De Geer (1587–1652), industrialist

Deaths

References

 
Years of the 16th century in Sweden
Sweden